Līgatne Parish is an administrative territorial entity of Cēsis Municipality in the Vidzeme region of Latvia. 
Pop. 2864 (2005). It coveres an area of 160.6 km².

From 2009 until 2021, Līgatne Parish was part of the former Līgatne Municipality.

References

Parishes of Latvia
Cēsis Municipality
Vidzeme